Duke Street in Bath, Somerset, England was built in 1748 by John Wood, the Elder. Several of the buildings have been designated as Grade I listed buildings. The street, which overlooks the River Avon, is pedestrianised with no vehicles permitted to enter.

Duke Street was part of a wider scheme to build a Royal Forum, including South Parade, Pierrepont Street and North Parade, similar to Queen Square, which was never completed. Wood designed the facade, of Bath stone, after which a variety of builders completed the work with different interiors and rear elevations. Many of the buildings are now hotels whilst some remain as private residences.

Numbers 1 and 2 are known as the Georgian House, and numbers 3, 4 and 5 form part of the Southbourne Hotel.

The last house, number 14, adjoins number 14 North Parade.

See also

 List of Grade I listed buildings in Bath and North East Somerset

References

Grade I listed buildings in Bath, Somerset
Streets in Bath, Somerset